Johan Nomdo Jansonius (born 1932) is a Dutch chemist.

data analysis

Jansonius obtained his PhD from the University of Groningen in 1967 with a thesis titled: "De kristalstructuur van papaïne : een röntgendiffractie-onderzoek met een oplossend vermogen van 4,5 Å". He subsequently was lector of protein structure chemistry at the same university between 1971 and 1973. He was professor of structural biology at the University of Basel between 1973 and 1998 and introduced the field of protein crystallography there. He was chair of the Biozentrum University of Basel from 1989 to 1991.

Jansonius was elected a corresponding member of the Royal Netherlands Academy of Arts and Sciences in 1988.

References

1932 births
Living people
20th-century Dutch chemists
Members of the Royal Netherlands Academy of Arts and Sciences
Academic staff of the University of Basel
University of Groningen alumni